George Ashworth (February 20, 1912 – March 6, 1994) was an American college football player and coach. He served as the head football coach at Indiana State University from 1949 to 1950, compiling a record of 2–16–1.

Head coaching record

References

External links
 Indiana Football Hall of Fame
 

1912 births
1994 deaths
Indiana State Sycamores football coaches
Indiana State Sycamores football players
People from Mount Vernon, Indiana
Players of American football from Indiana